Daniele Federici (born 11 February 1988) is an Italian former footballer who played as a defender.

Career
Federici started his career at Internazionale. He left for Pro Sesto in 2006 on loan with option to purchase. In January Pro Sesto excised the option for a peppercorn fee of €500. In July 2007 Federici returned to Inter. In July 2008, he was farmed to Grosseto on joint-ownership deal from Inter. He played 17 games in Serie B. He also played 1 games for Grosseto at promotion playoff.

In January 2012 Federici was signed by Frosinone in -year contract.

In July 2012 Federici retired from professional football.

References

External links
Profile at gazzetta.it

Italian footballers
Inter Milan players
F.C. Grosseto S.S.D. players
S.S.D. Pro Sesto players
Frosinone Calcio players
Serie B players
Association football defenders
Sportspeople from the Province of Viterbo
1988 births
Living people
Footballers from Lazio